Pseudacraea rubrobasalis, the lesser variable false acraea, is a butterfly in the family Nymphalidae. It is found in Nigeria, Cameroon, Gabon, the Republic of the Congo, the Democratic Republic of the Congo and Uganda.

Description
Very similar to Pseudacraea dolomena q.v. for differentiation.

Biology
The habitat consists of forests.

The larvae feed on Afrosersalisia species.

References

Butterflies described in 1903
Limenitidinae
Butterflies of Africa
Taxa named by Per Olof Christopher Aurivillius